The Japanese manga series Kaze no Daichi is written by Nobuhiro Sakata and illustrated by Eiji Kazama. It has been serialized in the seinen manga magazine Big Comic Original by Shogakukan since 1990.The series follows the story Keisuke Okita, who takes up golf at the age of 24 and through talent, hard work, and good coaching quickly turns into a pro. The chapters have been collected in 84 tankōbon and are released by Shogakukan.The first volume of Kaze no Daichi was released on March 30, 1991. As of September 30, 2021 eighty-one volumes have been released.



Volume list

References 

Kaze no Daichi